Ubaldo Rodríguez Santos (May 16, 1958 – December 13, 2022), known professionally as Lalo Rodríguez, was a Puerto Rican salsa singer recognized as one of the pioneers of the subgenre of Romantic or Erotic Salsa.

Early life
Rodriguez was born in Rio Piedras, Puerto Rico on May 16, 1958  to parents Magdalena Santos and Jose Rodriguez. At age nine, he started singing in traditional Puerto Rican festivals, as well as on radio and television programs. "Rodríguez won a children's talent contest at the age of seven and at 12 he was part of the Tempo Moderno orchestra, in which he remained for four years."<ref name="laopinion"

Early career
In 1973, at 15 years of age, with the help of producer Harvey Averne, Rodríguez moved from Puerto Rico to New York to join Eddie Palmieri's band. His debut album at the age of 17 was Palmieri's Sun of Latin Music, with Rodriguez providing vocals for the album's hit song "Un Dia Bonito" (a Beutiful Day) as well as “Nada de ti” (Nothing of you), “Nunca contigo” (Never with you) and “Deseo salvaje” (Wild desire) - a bolero written by Rodríguez.  This 1975 album would be the first Salsa album to win a Grammy at the 18th Grammy Awards.   A year later he sang on Unfinished Masterpiece, which was nominated for a Grammy at 19th Grammy Awards in 1976. Palmieri gave him his new first name "Lalo." After leaving Palmieri, he was invited to join, Machito Grillo's Orchestra where they recorded the album “Fireworks“, which was also nominated for a Grammy. By the age of 18, he had recorded 3 albums, the first won a Grammy and the other two were nominated for Grammy awards. Thereafter, Rodríguez returned to Puerto Rico where he joined Tommy Olivencia's group. 

In 1980, Rodríguez "went solo," releasing his first studio album Simplemente... Lalo featuring the salsa classic "Tu No Sabes Querer" (You don't know how to love).

During the 1980s Rodriguez recorded a total of six albums. As a result of these recordings, he has been recognized as one of the pioneers of the subgenre of Romantic or Erotic Salsa which is described as having "light, frothy songs with erotic lyrics." "Rodriguez’s Ven Devórame Otra Vez (Come devour me once more), with its celebrated reference to moistened bed linen, was a prime example [of salsa romantica].” Rodríguez was awarded "Tropical Song of the Year" at the Lo Nuestro Awards in 1989 for the hit, "Ven, Devórame Otra Vez". The song charted #10 on the Hot Latin Tracks. Other late 1980's early 1990's salsa romantica contemporaries include Eddie Santiago, Frankie Ruiz and Anthony Cruz. Rodriguez was known for a charismatic stage presence and he often interacted with his audience in the tradition of the great Cheo Feliciano.

Later career
Throughout the early and mid 1990s, Rodríguez continued to record and produce new albums. In 1994, he was brought back to the Copacabana of New York by Chino Rodríguez, who became Rodríguez's manager for a short period and had Harvey Averne talk to Capitol EMI Latin to re-record Rodríguez with the project Nací Para Cantar, which sold RIAA Platinum. Rodríguez's final album to date, Estoy Aquí, was released in 1996.

After a long absence from recording, Rodríguez returned in the late 2000s with a new album entitled Con Todo Mi Corazon, an album that had not been released to the public as of 2013. On January 30, 2020, Rodríguez announced that the release of this album would officially happen later in the year, though an exact date had not been confirmed as of 2021.

Personal life

Marriage and family
Rodríguez resided in Orlando, Florida for more than 20 years with his wife Wanda Torres, whom he married in 1986. The couple had four children, one of whom was adopted in 2006. In a 2020 interview with El Vocero, Rodríguez stated that he had filed for divorce from Torres and had relocated to Puerto Rico.

Legal issues
Throughout much of his career, Rodríguez had a history of drug and alcohol abuse, which led him to problems with his family and the law.

Rodríguez was arrested on March 20, 2011, and charged with domestic violence, accused of attempting to strangle his wife Wanda. He posted $1,500 shortly afterwards, but was arrested again in May for possession of cocaine and violating his restraining order by contacting his wife. In an interview with Primera Hora, Rodríguez recalled the events differently from what his wife had originally told the media, citing that he had accused her of infidelity and wanted a divorce (though both would ultimately reconcile). Rodríguez was eventually released in July and placed on two years of probation and drug rehabilitation.

Death
Rodríguez died in Carolina, Puerto Rico on December 13, 2022, at the age of 64. He was buried at the Santa Cruz Cemetery in Carolina.

Discography

Contributing artist
 1974: The Sun of Latin Music (with Eddie Palmieri)
 1975: Unfinished Masterpiece (with Eddie Palmieri)
 1977: Fireworks (with Machito)

Studio albums
 1980: Simplemente... Lalo
 1982: Nuevamente... Lalo
 1985: El Niño, el Hombre, el Soñador, el Loco
 1987: Punto y Coma
 1988: Un Nuevo Despertar
 1989: Sexsacional..!
 1992: De Vuelta en la Trampa
 1994: Nací Para Cantar
 1996: Estoy Aquí
 Con Todo Mi Corazon (unreleased)

Reissue albums
 1990: Una Voz Para Escuchar (reissue of Nuevamente... Lalo)
 1991: ¡Plena-Mente, Lalo! (reissue of El Niño, el Hombre, el Soñador, el Loco)
 1992: Como Siempre Lalo (reissue of Punto y Coma)

Compilation albums
 1981: Evolución
 1981: Simplemente Lalo... Otra Vez
 1994: Oro Salsero: 20 Éxitos
 1995: Lalo Rodríguez y la Salsa Mayor
 1997: Colección: Mi Historia
 2000: Serie Sensacional
 2002: Edicion Limitada
 2003: Antologia
 2004: Serie Top 10
 2006: Pura Salsa
 2008: The Greatest Salsa Ever
 2013: 12 Favoritas
 2015: Salsa Legends

See also
 Salsa
 Salsa Romantica
 Music of Puerto Rico
 List of Puerto Ricans
 List of number-one Billboard Tropical Albums from the 1980s

References

External links
 Official MySpace Site
 
 
 
 Grammy Awards winners at Grammy.com (searchable database)

1958 births
2022 deaths
People from Carolina, Puerto Rico
Rodven Records artists
Salsa musicians
20th-century Puerto Rican male singers
21st-century Puerto Rican male singers
Lalo Rodríguez albums